Francis Keita Agyepong (born 16 June 1965, in London) is a male retired English triple jumper.

Athletics career
Agyepong won the silver medal in at the 1996 European Indoor Championships in Athletics, and finished 7th at the 1995 IAAF World Indoor Championships. His personal best was 17.18 metres, achieved in July 1995 in London.

He represented England in the triple jump event, at the 1994 Commonwealth Games in Victoria, British Columbia, Canada.

Personal life
His younger sister, Jacqui Agyepong, is a former hurdler.

International competitions

References

 

1965 births
Living people
Athletes from London
English male triple jumpers
British male triple jumpers
Black British sportsmen
Olympic athletes of Great Britain
Athletes (track and field) at the 1992 Summer Olympics
Athletes (track and field) at the 1996 Summer Olympics
Athletes (track and field) at the 1994 Commonwealth Games
Commonwealth Games competitors for England
World Athletics Championships athletes for Great Britain